San Martino a Gangalandi is a Roman Catholic parish (pieve) church in the Gangalandi neighborhood of Lastra a Signa in the region of Tuscany, Italy. It is located via Leon Battista Alberti. Adjacent to the church is a small Museo Vicariale (Vicarial Museum) displaying some works of art.

History
The church in this district was first documented by 1108. A church was first erected in a Romanesque-style in the 12th-century as an oratory for a Marian confraternity apparently established following the visit to Florence of Saint Peter Martyr. The dedication to St Martin of Tours suggests an earlier Carolingian and Frankish foundation. The church underwent a refurbishment in the 15th century by the Renaissance architect Leon Battista Alberti. Midway along the left flank is a slim tall bell tower.

The interior is notable for frescoes (1433) in the chapel of the Baptistry by Bicci di Lorenzo. The 15th-century baptismal font has sculpted marble reliefs. Other paintings in the interior include:
Five Saints by Pietro Salvestrini
Madonna and Child between St Lawrence and the Guardian Angel attributed to Antonio del Ceraiolo 
Virgin of the Assumption between Saints Charles Borromeo, Bartholomew, Francis and Martin (1615) by Matteo Rosselli 
San Cristoforo (fresco left wall)
Life of St Donnino (13th-century) 
Annunciation attributed to Domenico Passignano, derived from Oratory of Santissima Annunziata
Tomb of Agnolo Pandolfini (1421) 
Death of St Joseph by Francesco Conti

The adjacent museum, established in 1986 with the financing by the Ente Cassa di Risparmio di Firenze, displays a Madonna of the Humility (circa 1405) painted by Lorenzo Monaco. There is also a triptych attributed to Lorenzo di Bicci and to his son Bicci di Lorenzo: the panels depict Virgin giving her girdle to Saint Thomas in the center, flanked by Saints Nicholas of Bari, Andrew, John the Baptist, and Anthony the Abbot. The museum displays a Madonna and Child by Jacopo del Sellaio. Three panels depicting the Decollation of John the Baptist between Saints Francis of Paola and Carlo Borromeo attributed to Filippo Paladini.

References

12th-century Roman Catholic church buildings in Italy
Churches in the metropolitan city of Florence
Art museums and galleries in Tuscany